Tetrataenia is a genus of spur-throat toothpick grasshoppers in the family Acrididae. There are at least two described species in Tetrataenia, found in South America.

Species
These species belong to the genus Tetrataenia:
 Tetrataenia surinama (Linnaeus, 1764)
 Tetrataenia virgata (Gerstaecker, 1889)

References

External links

 

Acrididae